The Interreligious Council of Bosnia and Herzegovina (Međureligijsko vijeće u Bosni i Hercegovini, MRV) was established in 1997 with help from the World Conference of Religions for Peace. Its founding members included Grand Mufti Mustafa Cerić, Metropolitan Nikolaj of Dabar-Bosnia, Cardinal and Archbishop of Vrhbosna Vinko Puljić, and Jakob Finci of Jewish Community of Bosnia and Herzegovina.

External links
 

Organizations established in 1997
Religious organizations based in Bosnia and Herzegovina